Kawankathaung is a village in the Kawkareik District of the Kayin State, Myanmar, located on the east bank of the Winyaw River.

External links 
"Kawankathaung Map — Satellite Images of Kawankathaung" Maplandia World Gazetteer

References 

Villages in Myanmar